Captain Sir James Brisbane, CB (1774 – 19 December 1826) was a British Royal Navy officer of the French Revolutionary and Napoleonic Wars. Although never engaged in any major actions, Brisbane served under both Lord Howe and Horatio Nelson and performed important work at the Cape of Good Hope, prior to the Battle of Copenhagen and in the Adriatic campaign of 1807–1814. In later life Brisbane became commander-in-chief in the East Indies. He contracted dysentery in Burma and arrived in Port Jackson in Sydney aboard , where he died on 19 December 1826. He was a cousin of General Sir Thomas Brisbane who had earlier been governor of New South Wales.

Career
James Brisbane was born in 1774, the fifth son of Admiral John Brisbane and the younger brother of future Admiral Charles Brisbane. In 1787, Brisbane went to sea aboard  and by 1794 he was signal midshipman aboard Lord Howe's flagship . Brisbane served in this capacity at the Glorious First of June, where Queen Charlotte was heavily engaged and badly damaged. In the aftermath of the battle, Brisbane was promoted to lieutenant and was sent to the Cape of Good Hope, later joining George Elphinstone's flagship  and being present at the surrender of a Dutch squadron in Saldanha Bay.

Brisbane was promoted to commander and given command of one of the captured Dutch ships, the sloop , which the Royal Navy renamed Daphne. When she reached Plymouth in September 1797 the Navy paid off Daphne and Brisbane was put on half-pay. Cruizer was attached to Sir Hyde Parker's Baltic fleet on commissioning and Brisbane came under the direct command of Admiral Horatio Nelson, who used Cruizer to take soundings and make charts of the approaches to Copenhagen prior to the British attack on the city at the Battle of Copenhagen. Brisbane impressed his superiors in this duty and in 1801 was made a post-captain and commanded  under Admiral Thomas Totty until the admiral's death.

He later participated in the capture of several of the Ionian Islands and remained in the region until 1811, becoming an expert in coastal operations.

He then transferred to the command of the newly built  in the Channel Fleet. In 1813 he returned to the Mediterranean Sea, where he remained for the rest of the war.

The squadron silenced the fort's guns, and attacked 20 vessels; 4 were captured, and the cargoes of another 15 taken off ships whose crews scuttled them.

He was appointed a Companion of the Order of the Bath on 16 September 1815.

In 1825, Brisbane was made commander-in-chief of the East Indies Station and sailed there as commodore, arriving in 1826 and taking part in the latter stages of the First Anglo-Burmese War, in which he had some success in riverine operations. During the campaign however he contracted a fatal illness and died from it aboard  in Sydney in 1826.

Brisbane is remembered as a popular and capable commander whose expertise was focused on coastal and riverine operations, which he conducted with success throughout his career.

Memorial

A memorial to Sir James Brisbane was erected in St James' Church, Sydney in 1830.

Notes

References

Further reading

External links

1774 births
1826 deaths
Royal Navy officers
Knights Bachelor
Companions of the Order of the Bath
Royal Navy personnel of the French Revolutionary Wars
Royal Navy personnel of the Napoleonic Wars
British military personnel of the First Anglo-Burmese War
Royal Navy personnel of the Bombardment of Algiers (1816)
Deaths from dysentery
Infectious disease deaths in New South Wales